Jang Sel-gi  (born 31 May 1994) is a South Korean footballer who plays as a defender or a midfielder for Hyundai Steel Red Angels and the South Korea national team. She previously played for INAC Kobe Leonessa in the Nadeshiko League. Jang was named Asian Young Footballer of the Year in 2013.

Club career

INAC Kobe Leonessa
On 16 January 2015, Jang signed a one-year contract with INAC Kobe Leonessa. After spending the first half of the season injured, she made her first league appearance in a 1–0 home victory against Albirex Niigata Ladies on 5 September 2015, coming on as a substitute in the 66th minute. On 15 November 2015, she made her Empress's Cup debut in a 4–0 win over Bunnys Kyoto SC. She made a total of 8 appearances for the club in all competitions.

Incheon Hyundai Steel Red Angels
On 21 January 2016, Jang joined Incheon Hyundai Steel Red Angels in the WK League. On 14 March 2016, she made her debut in a 2–1 win over Seoul WFC. In the 2016 season, she scored 9 goals and recorded 4 assists in 24 appearances. In the 2017 season, she scored 11 goals and recorded 5 assists in 29 appearances. In 2018, Jang scored 11 goals and set up seven others in 27 matches, helping the Red Angels win their sixth consecutive championship.

International career
In 2010, Jang was part of the under-17 team that won the FIFA U-17 Women's World Cup. In 2013, she led the under-19 team to their second AFC U-19 Women's Championship title. She was the 2013 AFC U-19 Women's Championship's top scorer with eight goals in five appearances, including five goals in a 7–0 win over Myanmar and one goal in each game against China, North Korea and Australia. As a result, she was named the tournament MVP and awarded the Golden Boot. In November 2013, she was named Asian Young Footballer of the Year. 

On 6 March 2013, Jang made her senior debut for South Korea in a 2–0 win against South Africa in the Cyprus Cup. On 4 June 2016, she scored her first goal in a 5–0 win against Myanmar.

Career statistics

International
Scores and results list South Korea's goal tally first, score column indicates score after each Jang goal.

Honours

Club
Incheon Hyundai Steel Red Angels	
WK League: 2016, 2017, 2018, 2019, 2021

International
AFC U-16 Women's Championship: 2009
FIFA U-17 Women's World Cup: 2010
AFC U-19 Women's Championship: 2013
Asian Games Bronze medal: 2018

Individual
 Asian Young Footballer of the Year: 2013
AFC U-19 Women's Championship MVP: 2013
AFC U-19 Women's Championship Golden Boot: 2013
KFA Footballer of the Year: 2018

References

External links

 
Jang Sel-gi at the Korea Football Association (KFA)
Jang Sel-gi at Korea Women's Football Federation (KWFF)

1994 births
Living people
Sportspeople from Incheon
South Korean women's footballers
South Korean expatriate footballers
South Korea women's under-17 international footballers
South Korea women's under-20 international footballers
South Korea women's international footballers
Women's association football defenders
Women's association football midfielders
Expatriate women's footballers in Japan
Expatriate women's footballers in Spain
South Korean expatriate sportspeople in Japan
South Korean expatriate sportspeople in Spain
Footballers at the 2018 Asian Games
Asian Games bronze medalists for South Korea
Asian Games medalists in football
Medalists at the 2018 Asian Games
INAC Kobe Leonessa players
Incheon Hyundai Steel Red Angels WFC players
Nadeshiko League players
WK League players
Primera División (women) players
2019 FIFA Women's World Cup players